Jaroslav Walter (January 6, 1939 in Sobědraž (now part of Kostelec nad Vltavou), Czechoslovakia – June 20, 2014) was an ice hockey player who played for the Czechoslovak national team. He won a bronze medal at the 1964 Winter Olympics. Between 1991 and 1992 he was assistant coach of the Czechoslovak national team.

References

External links

1939 births
2014 deaths
People from Písek District
ATSE Graz players
Czechoslovak ice hockey forwards
Czechoslovakia men's national ice hockey team coaches
HC Dukla Jihlava players
HC Litvínov players
Ice hockey players at the 1964 Winter Olympics
Medalists at the 1964 Winter Olympics
Olympic bronze medalists for Czechoslovakia
Olympic ice hockey players of Czechoslovakia
Olympic medalists in ice hockey
Sportspeople from the South Bohemian Region
Czechoslovak expatriate sportspeople in Austria
Expatriate ice hockey players in Austria
Czechoslovak expatriate ice hockey people
Czechoslovak expatriate sportspeople in West Germany
Czechoslovak expatriate sportspeople in Germany
Czech ice hockey coaches
Czechoslovak ice hockey coaches